Herbert Lewin is the name of:

 Herbert Lewin (physician) (1899-1982), German physician, president of the Central Council of Jews in Germany (1963–1969)
 Herbert G. Lewin (1914-2010), American politician